

The Advanced Soaring Concepts Apex was a remotely piloted sailplane designed to take part in a NASA study of high-altitude aerodynamics.

It was planned to lift the aircraft to around 100,000 ft (30,487 m) by balloon and release it there.

Rockets would assist the aircraft to transition to horizontal flight. The Apex's wing was designed by Dr Mark Drela of the Massachusetts Institute of Technology, and mounted a "wake rake" containing sensors to measure drag behind the wing.

Flights were originally scheduled for 1998, but the program fell behind schedule.

In January 1999, the aircraft was reportedly under construction and would be delivered to the Dryden Flight Research Center for flights beginning in March or early April. By that time, however, the project had been mothballed.

It was revived briefly one year later, before being cancelled altogether.

References
 Description of Apex project on NASA Dryden website
 
 NASA Dryden news release 6 April 1998 - NASA's environmental research aircraft and sensor technology program Apex project completes critical design review

Apex
1990s United States experimental aircraft
1990s United States sailplanes
Unmanned aerial vehicles of the United States
Glider aircraft
Mid-wing aircraft